Completely Serious is the second comedy album released by the comedian Daniel Tosh. The special originally aired on Comedy Central. Although originally airing as a Comedy Central Special, the live recording was released independently and is only available on DVD. Completely Serious is the follow-up to Tosh's CD debut, True Stories I Made Up.

Special features
These are the special features that were on the DVD:
 Daniel's prank phone call to author Stephen King about Pet Sematary
 Daniel's post-show banter with fans
 5 deleted scenes
 Daniel's apology to frigid old women who have more than five cats
 DVD cover shoot
 Daniel's hidden camera scenes from The Bunny Ranch

References

External links

2006 live albums
Image Entertainment live albums
2000s comedy albums